"Anywhere" is the second single from R&B group 112 from their 1998 album, Room 112. Q and Slim share lead vocals and the song features Lil' Zane.

Charts

Weekly charts

Year-end charts

References 

1999 singles
112 (band) songs
Bad Boy Records singles
Songs written by Daron Jones
Music videos directed by Hype Williams
1998 songs
Songs written by Quinnes Parker
Songs written by Slim (singer)